Dinachal (also Romanized as Dīnāchāl and Denyā Chāl) is a village in Dinachal Rural District, Pareh Sar District, Rezvanshahr County, Gilan Province, Iran. At the 2006 census, its population was 452, in 111 families.

References 

Populated places in Rezvanshahr County